The Bedfordshire Historical Record Society is an historical society and text publication society for the county of Bedfordshire in England. It was established in 1912.

Selected publications
A Bedfordshire bibliography: with some comments and biographical notes by L. R. Conisbee and A. R. Threadgill (1962-1978). 1967 Supplement, Second Supplement, Third Supplement.

See also
 Bedfordshire and Luton Archives and Records Service

References 

1912 establishments in England
History of Bedfordshire
Historical societies of the United Kingdom
Text publication societies
Organisations based in Bedfordshire